A marine steam engine is a steam engine that is used to power a ship or boat. This article deals mainly with marine steam engines of the reciprocating type, which were in use from the inception of the steamboat in the early 19th century to their last years of large-scale manufacture during World War II. Reciprocating steam engines were progressively replaced in marine applications during the 20th century by steam turbines and marine diesel engines.

History
The first commercially successful steam engine was developed by Thomas Newcomen in 1712. The steam engine improvements brought forth by James Watt in the later half of the 18th century greatly improved steam engine efficiency and allowed more compact engine arrangements. Successful adaptation of the steam engine to marine applications in England would have to wait until almost a century after Newcomen, when Scottish engineer William Symington built the world's "first practical steamboat", the Charlotte Dundas, in 1802. Rivaling inventors James Rumsey and John Fitch were the first to build steamboats in the United States. Rumsey exhibited his steamboat design in 1787 on the Potomac River; however, Fitch won the rivalry in 1790 after his successful test resulted in a passenger service on the Delaware River. In 1807, the American Robert Fulton built the world's first commercially successful steamboat, simply known as the North River Steamboat, and powered by a Watt engine.

Following Fulton's success, steamboat technology developed rapidly on both sides of the Atlantic. Steamboats initially had a short range and were not particularly seaworthy due to their weight, low power, and tendency to break down, but they were employed successfully along rivers and canals, and for short journeys along the coast. The first successful transatlantic crossing by a steamship occurred in 1819 when  sailed from Savannah, Georgia to Liverpool, England. The first steamship to make regular transatlantic crossings was the sidewheel steamer  in 1838.

As the 19th century progressed, marine steam engines and steamship technology developed alongside each other. Paddle propulsion gradually gave way to the screw propeller, and the introduction of iron and later steel hulls to replace the traditional wooden hull allowed ships to grow ever larger, necessitating steam power plants that were increasingly complex and powerful.

Types of marine steam engine

A wide variety of reciprocating marine steam engines were developed over the course of the 19th century. The two main methods of classifying such engines are by connection mechanism and cylinder technology.

Most early marine engines had the same cylinder technology (simple expansion, see below) but a number of different methods of supplying power to the crankshaft (i.e. connection mechanism) were in use. Thus, early marine engines are classified mostly according to their connection mechanism. Some common connection mechanisms were side-lever, steeple, walking beam and direct-acting (see following sections).

However, steam engines can also be classified according to cylinder technology (simple-expansion, compound, annular etc.). One can therefore find examples of engines classified under both methods. An engine can be a compound walking beam type, compound being the cylinder technology, and walking beam being the connection method. Over time, as most engines became direct-acting but cylinder technologies grew more complex, people began to classify engines solely according to cylinder technology.

More commonly encountered marine steam engine types are listed in the following sections. Note that not all these terms are exclusive to marine applications.

Engines classified by connection mechanism

Side-lever

The side-lever engine was the first type of steam engine widely adopted for marine use in Europe. In the early years of steam navigation (from c1815), the side-lever was the most common type of marine engine for inland waterway and coastal service in Europe, and it remained for many years the preferred engine for oceangoing service on both sides of the Atlantic.

The side-lever was an adaptation of the earliest form of steam engine, the beam engine. The typical side-lever engine had a pair of heavy horizontal iron beams, known as side levers, that connected in the centre to the bottom of the engine with a pin. This connection allowed a limited arc for the levers to pivot in. These levers extended, on the cylinder side, to each side of the bottom of the vertical engine cylinder. A piston rod, connected vertically to the piston, extended out of the top of the cylinder. This rod attached to a horizontal crosshead, connected at each end to vertical rods (known as side-rods). These rods connected down to the levers on each side of the cylinder. This formed the connection of the levers to the piston on the cylinder side of the engine. The other side of the levers (the opposite end of the lever pivot to the cylinder) were connected to each other with a horizontal crosstail. This crosstail in turn connected to and operated a single connecting rod, which turned the crankshaft. The rotation of the crankshaft was driven by the levers—which, at the cylinder side, were driven by the piston's vertical oscillation.

The main disadvantage of the side-lever engine was that it was large and heavy. For inland waterway and coastal service, lighter and more efficient designs soon replaced it. It remained the dominant engine type for oceangoing service through much of the first half of the 19th century however, due to its relatively low centre of gravity, which gave ships more stability in heavy seas. It was also a common early engine type for warships, since its relatively low height made it less susceptible to battle damage. From the first Royal Navy steam vessel in 1820 until 1840, 70 steam vessels entered service, the majority with side-lever engines, using boilers set to 4psi maximum pressure. The low steam pressures dictated the large cylinder sizes for the side-lever engines, though the effective pressure on the piston was the difference between the boiler pressure and the vacuum in the condenser.

The side-lever engine was a paddlewheel engine and was not suitable for driving screw propellers. The last ship built for transatlantic service that had a side-lever engine was the Cunard Line's paddle steamer , considered an anachronism when it entered service in 1862.

Grasshopper

The grasshopper or 'half-lever' engine was a variant of the side-lever engine. The grasshopper engine differs from the conventional side-lever in that the location of the lever pivot and connecting rod are more or less reversed, with the pivot located at one end of the lever instead of the centre, while the connecting rod is attached to the lever between the cylinder at one end and the pivot at the other.

Chief advantages of the grasshopper engine were cheapness of construction and robustness, with the type said to require less maintenance than any other type of marine steam engine. Another advantage is that the engine could be easily started from any crank position. Like the conventional side-lever engine however, grasshopper engines were disadvantaged by their weight and size. They were mainly used in small watercraft such as riverboats and tugs.

Crosshead (square)

The crosshead engine, also known as a square, sawmill or A-frame engine, was a type of paddlewheel engine used in the United States. It was the most common type of engine in the early years of American steam navigation.

The crosshead engine is described as having a vertical cylinder above the crankshaft, with the piston rod secured to a horizontal crosshead, from each end of which, on opposite sides of the cylinder, extended a connecting rod that rotated its own separate crankshaft. The crosshead moved within vertical guides so that the assembly maintained the correct path as it moved. The engine's alternative name—"A-frame"—presumably derived from the shape of the frames that supported these guides. Some crosshead engines had more than one cylinder, in which case the piston rods were usually all connected to the same crosshead. An unusual feature of early examples of this type of engine was the installation of flywheels—geared to the crankshafts—which were thought necessary to ensure smooth operation. These gears were often noisy in operation.

Because the cylinder was above the crankshaft in this type of engine, it had a high center of gravity, and was therefore deemed unsuitable for oceangoing service. This largely confined it to vessels built for inland waterways. As marine engines grew steadily larger and heavier through the 19th century, the high center of gravity of square crosshead engines became increasingly impractical, and by the 1840s, ship builders abandoned them in favor of the walking beam engine.

The name of this engine can cause confusion, as "crosshead" is also an alternative name for the steeple engine (below). Many sources thus prefer to refer to it by its informal name of "square" engine to avoid confusion. Additionally, the marine crosshead or square engine described in this section should not be confused with the term "square engine" as applied to internal combustion engines, which in the latter case refers to an engine whose bore is equal to its stroke.

Walking beam

The walking beam, also known as a "vertical beam", "overhead beam", or simply "beam", was another early adaptation of the beam engine, but its use was confined almost entirely to the United States. After its introduction, the walking beam quickly became the most popular engine type in America for inland waterway and coastal service, and the type proved to have remarkable longevity, with walking beam engines still being occasionally manufactured as late as the 1940s. In marine applications, the beam itself was generally reinforced with iron struts that gave it a characteristic diamond shape, although the supports on which the beam rested were often built of wood. The adjective "walking" was applied because the beam, which rose high above the ship's deck, could be seen operating, and its rocking motion was (somewhat fancifully) likened to a walking motion.

Walking beam engines were a type of paddlewheel engine and were rarely used for powering propellers. They were used primarily for ships and boats working in rivers, lakes and along the coastline, but were a less popular choice for seagoing vessels because the great height of the engine made the vessel less stable in heavy seas. They were also of limited use militarily, because the engine was exposed to enemy fire and could thus be easily disabled. Their popularity in the United States was due primarily to the fact that the walking beam engine was well suited for the shallow-draft boats that operated in America's shallow coastal and inland waterways.

Walking beam engines remained popular with American shipping lines and excursion operations right into the early 20th century. Although the walking beam engine was technically obsolete in the later 19th century, it remained popular with excursion steamer passengers who expected to see the "walking beam" in motion. There were also technical reasons for retaining the walking beam engine in America, as it was easier to build, requiring less precision in its construction. Wood could be used for the main frame of the engine, at a much lower cost than typical practice of using iron castings for more modern engine designs. Fuel was also much cheaper in America than in Europe, so the lower efficiency of the walking beam engine was less of a consideration. The Philadelphia shipbuilder Charles H. Cramp blamed America's general lack of competitiveness with the British shipbuilding industry in the mid-to-late 19th century upon the conservatism of American domestic shipbuilders and shipping line owners, who doggedly clung to outdated technologies like the walking beam and its associated paddlewheel long after they had been abandoned in other parts of the world.

Steeple

The steeple engine, sometimes referred to as a "crosshead" engine, was an early attempt to break away from the beam concept common to both the walking beam and side-lever types, and come up with a smaller, lighter, more efficient design. In a steeple engine, the vertical oscillation of the piston is not converted to a horizontal rocking motion as in a beam engine, but is instead used to move an assembly, composed of a crosshead and two rods, through a vertical guide at the top of the engine, which in turn rotates the crankshaft connecting rod below. In early examples of the type, the crosshead assembly was rectangular in shape, but over time it was refined into an elongated triangle. The triangular assembly above the engine cylinder gives the engine its characteristic "steeple" shape, hence the name.

Steeple engines were tall like walking beam engines, but much narrower laterally, saving both space and weight. Because of their height and high centre of gravity, they were, like walking beams, considered less appropriate for oceangoing service, but they remained highly popular for several decades, especially in Europe, for inland waterway and coastal vessels.

Steeple engines began to appear in steamships in the 1830s and the type was perfected in the early 1840s by the Scottish shipbuilder David Napier. The steeple engine was gradually superseded by the various types of direct-acting engine.

Siamese

The Siamese engine, also referred to as the "double cylinder" or "twin cylinder" engine, was another early alternative to the beam or side-lever engine. This type of engine had two identical, vertical engine cylinders arranged side-by-side, whose piston rods were attached to a common, T-shaped crosshead. The vertical arm of the crosshead extended down between the two cylinders and was attached at the bottom to both the crankshaft connecting rod and to a guide block that slid between the vertical sides of the cylinders, enabling the assembly to maintain the correct path as it moved.

The Siamese engine was invented by British engineer Joseph Maudslay (son of Henry), but although he invented it after his oscillating engine (see below), it failed to achieve the same widespread acceptance, as it was only marginally smaller and lighter than the side-lever engines it was designed to replace. It was however used on a number of mid-century warships, including the first warship fitted with a screw propeller, .

Direct acting

There are two definitions of a direct-acting engine encountered in 19th-century literature. The earlier definition applies the term "direct-acting" to any type of engine other than a beam (i.e. walking beam, side-lever or grasshopper) engine. The later definition only uses the term for engines that apply power directly to the crankshaft via the piston rod and/or connecting rod. Unless otherwise noted, this article uses the later definition.

Unlike the side-lever or beam engine, a direct-acting engine could be readily adapted to power either paddlewheels or a propeller. As well as offering a lower profile, direct-acting engines had the advantage of being smaller and weighing considerably less than beam or side-lever engines. The Royal Navy found that on average a direct-acting engine (early definition) weighed 40% less and required an engine room only two thirds the size of that for a side-lever of equivalent power. One disadvantage of such engines is that they were more prone to wear and tear and thus required more maintenance.

Oscillating

An oscillating engine was a type of direct-acting engine that was designed to achieve further reductions in engine size and weight. Oscillating engines had the piston rods connected directly to the crankshaft, dispensing with the need for connecting rods. To achieve this, the engine cylinders were not immobile as in most engines, but secured in the middle by trunnions that let the cylinders themselves pivot back and forth as the crankshaft rotated—hence the term, oscillating. Steam was supplied and exhausted through the trunnions. The oscillating motion of the cylinder was usually used to line up ports in the trunnions to direct the steam feed and exhaust to the cylinder at the correct times. However, separate valves were often provided, controlled by the oscillating motion. This let the timing be varied to enable expansive working (as in the engine in the paddle ship PD Krippen). This provides simplicity but still retains the advantages of compactness.

The first patented oscillating engine was built by Joseph Maudslay in 1827, but the type is considered to have been perfected by John Penn. Oscillating engines remained a popular type of marine engine for much of the 19th century.

Trunk

The trunk engine, another type of direct-acting engine, was originally developed as a means of reducing an engine's height while retaining a long stroke. (A long stroke was considered important at this time because it reduced the strain on components.)

A trunk engine locates the connecting rod within a large-diameter hollow piston. This "trunk" carries almost no load. The interior of the trunk is open to outside air, and is wide enough to accommodate the side-to-side motion of the connecting rod, which links a gudgeon pin at the piston head to an outside crankshaft.

The walls of the trunk were either bolted to the piston or cast as one piece with it, and moved back and forth with it. The working portion of the cylinder is annular or ring-shaped, with the trunk passing through the centre of the cylinder itself.

Early examples of trunk engines had vertical cylinders. However, ship builders quickly realized that the type was compact enough to lay horizontally across the keel. In this configuration, it was very useful to navies, as it had a profile low enough to fit entirely below a ship's waterline, as safe as possible from enemy fire. The type was generally produced for military service by John Penn.

Trunk engines were common on mid-19th century warships. They also powered commercial vessels, where—though valued for their compact size and low centre of gravity—they were expensive to operate. Trunk engines, however, did not work well with the higher boiler pressures that became prevalent in the latter half of the 19th century, and builders abandoned them for other solutions.

Trunk engines were normally large, but a small, mass-produced, high-revolution, high-pressure version was produced for the Crimean War. In being quite effective, the type persisted in later gunboats. An original trunk engine of the gunboat type exists in the Western Australian Museum in Fremantle. The engine's mode of operation, illustrating its compact nature, could be viewed on the Xantho  project's website.

Vibrating lever

The vibrating lever, or half-trunk engine, was a development of the conventional trunk engine conceived by Swedish-American engineer John Ericsson. Ericsson needed a small, low-profile engine like the trunk engine to power the U.S. Federal government's monitors, a type of warship developed during the American Civil War that had very little space for a conventional powerplant. The trunk engine itself was, however, unsuitable for this purpose, because the preponderance of weight was on the side of the engine that contained the cylinder and trunk—a problem that designers could not compensate for on the small monitor warships.

Ericsson resolved this problem by placing two horizontal cylinders back-to-back in the middle of the engine, working two "vibrating levers", one on each side, which by means of shafts and additional levers rotated a centrally located crankshaft. Vibrating lever engines were later used in some other warships and merchant vessels, but their use was confined to ships built in the United States and in Ericsson's native country of Sweden, and as they had few advantages over more conventional engines, were soon supplanted by other types.

Back acting

The back-acting engine, also known as the return connecting rod engine, was another engine designed to have a very low profile. The back-acting engine was in effect a modified steeple engine, laid horizontally across the keel of a ship rather than standing vertically above it. Instead of the triangular crosshead assembly found in a typical steeple engine however, the back-acting engine generally used a set of two or more elongated, parallel piston rods terminating in a crosshead to perform the same function. The term "back-acting" or "return connecting rod" derives from the fact that the connecting rod "returns" or comes back from the side of the engine opposite the engine cylinder to rotate a centrally located crankshaft.

Back-acting engines were another type of engine popular in both warships and commercial vessels in the mid-19th century, but like many other engine types in this era of rapidly changing technology, they were eventually abandoned for other solutions. There is only one known surviving back-acting engine—that of the TV Emery Rice (formerly ), now the centerpiece of a display at the American Merchant Marine Museum.

Vertical

As steamships grew steadily in size and tonnage through the course of the 19th century, the need for low profile, low centre-of-gravity engines correspondingly declined. Freed increasingly from these design constraints, engineers were able to revert to simpler, more efficient and more easily maintained designs. The result was the growing dominance of the so-called "vertical" engine (more correctly known as the vertical inverted direct acting engine).

In this type of engine, the cylinders are located directly above the crankshaft, with the piston rod/connecting rod assemblies forming a more or less straight line between the two. The configuration is similar to that of a modern internal combustion engine (one notable difference being that the steam engine is double acting, see below, whereas almost all internal combustion engines generate power only in the downward stroke). Vertical engines are sometimes referred to as "hammer", "forge hammer" or "steam hammer" engines, due to their roughly similar appearance to another common 19th-century steam technology, the steam hammer.

Vertical engines came to supersede almost every other type of marine steam engine toward the close of the 19th century. Because they became so common, vertical engines are not usually referred to as such, but are instead referred to based upon their cylinder technology, i.e. as compound, triple-expansion, quadruple-expansion etc. The term "vertical" for this type of engine is imprecise, since technically any type of steam engine is "vertical" if the cylinder is vertically oriented. An engine someone describes as "vertical" might not be of the vertical inverted direct-acting type, unless they use the term "vertical" without qualification.

Engines classified by cylinder technology

Simple expansion

A simple-expansion engine is a steam engine that expands the steam through only one stage, which is to say, all its cylinders are operated at the same pressure. Since this was by far the most common type of engine in the early period of marine engine development, the term "simple expansion" is rarely encountered. An engine is assumed to be simple-expansion unless otherwise stated.

Compound

A compound engine is a steam engine that operates cylinders through more than one stage, at different pressure levels. Compound engines were a method of improving efficiency. Until the development of compound engines, steam engines used the steam only once before they recycled it back to the boiler. A compound engine recycles the steam into one or more larger, lower-pressure second cylinders first, to use more of its heat energy. Compound engines could be configured to increase either a ship's economy or its speed. Broadly speaking, a compound engine can refer to a steam engine with any number of different-pressure cylinders—however, the term usually refers to engines that expand steam through only two stages, i.e., those that operate cylinders at only two different pressures (or "double-expansion" engines).

Note that a compound engine (including multiple-expansion engines, see below) can have more than one set of variable-pressure cylinders. For example, an engine might have two cylinders operating at pressure x and two operating at pressure y, or one cylinder operating at pressure x and three operating at pressure y. What makes it compound (or double-expansion) as opposed to multiple-expansion is that there are only two pressures, x and y.

The first compound engine believed to have been installed in a ship was that fitted to Henry Eckford by the American engineer James P. Allaire in 1824. However, many sources attribute the "invention" of the marine compound engine to Glasgow's John Elder in the 1850s. Elder made improvements to the compound engine that made it safe and economical for ocean-crossing voyages for the first time.

Triple or multiple expansion

A triple-expansion engine is a compound engine that expands the steam in three stages, e.g. an engine with three cylinders at three different pressures. A quadruple-expansion engine expands the steam in four stages, and so on. However, as explained above, the number of expansion stages defines the engine, not the number of cylinders, e.g. the RMS Titanic had four-cylinder, triple-expansion engines. The first successful commercial use was an engine built at Govan in Scotland by Alexander C. Kirk for the SS Aberdeen in 1881.

Multiple-expansion engine manufacture continued well into the 20th century. All 2,700 Liberty ships built by the United States during World War II were powered by triple-expansion engines, because the capacity of the US to manufacture marine steam turbines was entirely directed to the building of warships. The biggest manufacturer of triple-expansion engines during the war was the Joshua Hendy Iron Works. Toward the end of the war, turbine-powered Victory ships were manufactured in increasing numbers.

Annular

An annular engine is an unusual type of engine that has an annular (ring-shaped) cylinder. Some of American pioneering engineer James P. Allaire's early compound engines were of the annular type, with a smaller, high-pressure cylinder placed in the centre of a larger, ring-shaped low-pressure cylinder. Trunk engines were another type of annular engine. A third type of annular marine engine used the Siamese engine connecting mechanism—but instead of two separate cylinders, it had a single, annular-shaped cylinder wrapped around the vertical arm of the crosshead (see diagram under "Siamese" above).

Other terms

Some other terms are encountered in marine engine literature of the period. These terms, listed below, are usually used in conjunction with one or more of the basic engine classification terms listed above.

Simple

A simple engine is an engine that operates with single expansion of steam, regardless of the number of cylinders fitted to the engine. Up until about the mid-19th century, most ships had engines with only one cylinder, although some vessels had multiple cylinder simple engines, and/or more than one engine.

Double acting

A double acting engine is an engine where steam is applied to both sides of the piston. Earlier steam engines applied steam in only one direction, allowing momentum or gravity to return the piston to its starting place, but a double acting engine uses steam to force the piston in both directions, thus increasing rotational speed and power. Like the term "simple engine", the term "double acting" is less frequently encountered in the literature since almost all marine engines were of the double acting type.

Vertical, horizontal, inclined, inverted

These terms refer to the orientation of the engine cylinder. A vertical cylinder stands vertically with its piston rod operating above (or below) it. A vertical inverted engine is defined as a vertical cylinder arrangement, with the crankshaft mounted directly below the cylinder(s). With an inclined or horizontal type, the cylinder and piston are positioned at an incline or horizontally. An inclined inverted cylinder is an inverted cylinder operating at an incline. These terms are all generally used in conjunction with the engine types above. Thus, one may have a horizontal direct-acting engine, or an inclined compound double acting engine, etc.

Inclined and horizontal cylinders could be very useful in naval vessels as their orientation kept the engine profile as low as possible and thus less susceptible to damage. They could also be used in a low profile ship or to keep a ship's centre of gravity lower. In addition, inclined or horizontal cylinders had the advantage of reducing the amount of vibration by comparison with a vertical cylinder.

Geared
A geared engine or "geared screw" turns the propeller at a different rate to that of the engine. Early marine propeller engines were geared upward, which is to say the propeller was geared to run at a higher rotational speed than the engine itself ran at. As engines became faster and more powerful through the latter part of the 19th century, gearing was almost universally dispensed with, and the propeller ran at the same rotational speed as the engine. This direct drive arrangement is mechanically most efficient, and reciprocating steam engines are well suited to the rotational speed most efficient for screw propellers.

See also
 Evaporator (marine) – apparatus for obtaining boiler feedwater from sea water
 Guardian valve
 Steam boat
 Steam engine

Footnotes

References
American Society of Mechanical Engineers (1978): Joshua Hendy Iron Works - informational brochure.
Buell, Augustus C. (1906): The Memoirs of Charles H. Cramp, J. B. Lippincott Co., Philadelphia and London, pp. 92–93.
Chatterton, E. Keble (1910): Steamships and their Story, page 132, Cassell and Company Ltd.

Dumpleton, Bernard (2002): The Story Of The Paddle Steamer, Intellect Books (UK), .
Evers, Henry (1873): Steam and the Steam Engine: Land, Marine and Locomotive, William Collins, Sons & Co., London and Glasgow.
 Fox, Stephen (2003): Transatlantic: Samuel Cunard, Isambard Brunel, and the Great Atlantic Steamships, HarperCollins, .
Fry, Henry (1896): The History of North Atlantic Steam Navigation: With Some Account of Early Ships and Shipowners, Sampson Low, Marston & Co., London.
 Harvey, Steven (2007): It Started With a Steamboat: An American Saga, Authorhouse, p. 55, 
 Hilton, George W. (2002): Lake Michigan Passenger Steamers, Stanford University Press, p. 59, .
 Kludas, Arnold (2000?): Record Breakers of the North Atlantic: Blue Riband Liners 1838–1952, Brassey's, Inc., Washington, D.C., .
 Laxton, Frederick William (1855): The Civil Engineer and Architect's Journal, incorporated with The Architect, Volume XVIII, John Knott, London.
MacLehose, James (1906): Memoirs and portraits of one hundred Glasgow men who have died during the last thirty years and in their lives did much to make the city what it now is, James MacLehose & Sons, Glasgow, p. 118, as reproduced by the Glasgow Digital Library.
 Maginnis, Arthur J. (1900): The Atlantic Ferry: Its Ships, Men and Working, Whittaker and Co., London and New York.
Murray, Robert (1858): Rudimentary Treatise on Marine Engines and Steam Vessels: Together with Practical Remarks on the Screw and Propelling Power as Used in the Royal and Merchant Navy, Published by J. Weale.
 Seaton, Albert Edward (1885): A Manual Of Marine Engineering - Comprising The Designing, Construction, And Working Of Marine Machinery, 4th Edition, Charles Griffin & Co., London.
 Sennett, Richard and Oram, Sir Henry J. (1918): The Marine Steam Engine: A Treatise for Engineering Students, Young Engineers, and Officers of the Royal Navy and Mercantile Marine, Longmans, Green & Co., London, New York, Bombay and Calcutta.
Sutherland, John Lester (2004): Steamboats of Gloucester and the North Shore, The History Press, pp. 31-32.
Thurston, Robert Henry (1883): A History of the Growth of the Steam-engine, reprinted 2001 by Adamant Media Corporation, .
 Ward, J. H.: (1864): A Popular Treatise on Steam, and its Application to the Useful Arts, Especially to Navigation, D. Van Nostrand, New York, p. 60.

External links

 Video of model vibrating-lever engine of USS Monitor at YouTube
 Inclined inverted oscillating engine video at YouTube
 Tradition Sidewheel Steamboat Walking Beam Engine at YouTube

 
 
Steam engine
Steam power
Steam engines